San Nicolas is a city in the Mexican state of Tamaulipas. It was founded in 1768.

Populated places established in 1768
Populated places in Tamaulipas
1768 establishments in New Spain